The team is composed by Marcos Freitas, Tiago Apolónia and João Pedro Monteiro.Portugal reached the quarter-finals at 2012 Olympic Games in London, beating in the first round Great Britain and losing the quarter-finals against South Korea 2-3.

Current team
Marcos Freitas
João Monteiro
Tiago Apolónia
Diogo Carvalho
João Geraldo

2013 European Championships Qualifiers

Group A

Fixtures

External links
Portuguese Table Tennis Federation official website

Table tennis in Portugal
Table tennis